Guarea hoffmanniana is a species of flowering plant in the family Meliaceae. It occurs in Costa Rica and Panama.

References

hoffmanniana